Elelenwo is a town in the metropolitan area of Port Harcourt, Nigeria, a country in West Africa. It is home to several state-owned media establishments, including Rivers State Television (RSTV) and Radio Rivers.

Location
Elelenwo shares a border to the south with Eleme, beyond which lies Okrika Island. Otigba and Woji are on the western border, with Trans Amadi lying further west. Oil Mill Market is on the northern border and Rumukoroshe is even further north. Iriebe is on the eastern border and the Oyigbo local government area is east of Iriebe.

Overview
Elelenwo consists largely of mixed-income apartment buildings, public and privately owned estates, and single-family homes of varying styles. The Elelenwo police station is the only police station in town.

Education  
Elelenwo residents have access to a handful of Port Harcourt public and private schools, including:

Public schools
State Primary School 
Community Boys Secondary School

Private schools
Topline Schools
Archdeacon Crowther Memorial Girls' School (ACMGS)
Moncordel International School
Marygold International School, 58 Station Road
Covenant Group of Schools, 1 Grace Avenue

References

External links

 
Neighbourhoods in Port Harcourt
Populated places in Rivers State